The 2004 World Outdoor Bowls Championship women's triples was held at Victoria Park, Leamington Spa in England.

Originally the championships were going to take place in Kuala Lumpur, Malaysia, during 2003, but due to political reasons it was moved to England the following year.

Trish Steyn, Jill Hackland and Loraine Victor of South Africa won the triples gold medal.

Section tables
First round 4 sections, top two teams qualify for quarter finals.

Section A

Section B

Section C

Section D

Finals

Results

References 

Wom
World
Bow